The Latin America Memorial (in Portuguese, Memorial da América Latina) is a cultural, political and leisure complex, inaugurated in 1989, in São Paulo, Brazil. The architectural setting, designed by Oscar Niemeyer, is a monument to the cultural, political, social and economic integration  of Latin America, spanning an area of 84,482 square meters. Its cultural project was developed by Brazilian anthropologist Darcy Ribeiro. It is a public foundation, financially and administratively autonomous, maintained by the state government.

The architectural complex consists of several buildings arranged around two squares. It comprises: Salão de Atos Tiradentes (Tiradentes "hall of acts"), the Victor Civita Latin American Library, the Brazilian Center of Latin American Studies, the Marta Traba Gallery of Latin American Art, the Pavilhão da Criatividade ("creativity pavilion"), the Símon Bolívar Auditorium, and the Latin American Parliament building. In the main square (Praça Cívica), there is a large concrete sculpture, also designed by Oscar Niemeyer, representing an open hand in vertical position, with the map of Latin America painted in red. It's a symbol of Latin America's past of oppression and its battles for freedom, with the red map as a reminder of the blood from the sacrifices that were made.

The Memorial has a permanent collection of works of art, on display in indoor and outdoor areas, as well as a large assemblage of Latin American folk art, housed in the Pavilhão da Criatividade. The library comprises 30,000 titles, besides music and image departments. The Memorial promotes exhibitions, conferences, debates,  video sessions, theater, dance and music performances. It also has a research center specializing in Latin American issues and keeps an active bibliographic production. From 1989 to 2007, the Memorial also served as a host to the Latin American Parliament.

Fire

On November 29, 2013, the Simón Bolívar Auditorium caught fire, causing an extensive destruction of its inner parts. Causes of fire are unknown, although a short circuit was cited. Authorities predict more than 90% of the site have been consumed. Some employees stated the original blueprints from Oscar Niemeyer were inside the building. 25 firefighters were wounded, many of them because a flashover occurred during their attempt to ventilate the building.

See also
 Museu Paulista
 Museum of the Portuguese Language
 MALBA
 Latin American art
 List of Oscar Niemeyer works

References

External links

—Official Latin America Memorial website 
Virtual Library of Latin America

Museums in São Paulo
Art museums and galleries in Brazil
Libraries in São Paulo
Monuments and memorials in São Paulo
Public art in Brazil
Museums established in 1989
1989 establishments in Brazil
Oscar Niemeyer buildings
Modernist architecture in Brazil